Gauthier is a French name of Germanic origin, corresponding to the English given name Walter.

People with the given name
Gauthier de Costes, seigneur de la Calprenède
Gauthier de Brienne, Counts Walter III of Brienne, Walter IV of Brienne, Walter V of Brienne Walter VI of Brienne
Gaultier Tirel, ostensible killer of William II of England
Gauthier of Pontoise, saint
Gotye, Belgian-Australian multi-instrumentalist

People with the surname
Albert Gauthier de Clagny (1853–1927), French politician
Bernard Gauthier (born 1924), French cyclist
Cathy Gauthier, Canadian curler
Charles-Arthur Gauthier, Canadian politician
Claude Gauthier (singer), French-Canadian singer-songwriter
Cutter Gauthier, Swedish ice hockey player
Dan Gauthier, American actor
Daniel Gauthier, Canadian ice hockey player
David Gauthier, Canadian-American philosopher
Denis Gauthier, Canadian ice hockey player
Éric Gauthier (writer), Canadian science fiction writer
Eric Gauthier (dancer), Canadian-born dancer, choreographer and musician
Eva Gauthier (1885-1958), Canadian mezzo-soprano and voice teacher
Frédérik Gauthier, Canadian ice hockey player
Gabe Gauthier, American ice hockey player
Gerard Gauthier, hockey linesman 
Henri Gauthier, comte de Rigny
Jacques Gauthier, zoologist
Jamie Gauthier, American Democratic politician
Jean Gauthier (1937–2013), Canadian ice hockey player
Jean Gauthier, French actor
Jean-Bernard Gauthier de Murnan, French general
Jean-Robert Gauthier, Canadian politician
Julien Gauthier, Canadian ice hockey player
Kerry Gauthier, Minnesota politician
Léo Gauthier, Canadian politician
Marcel Gauthier, Canadian wrestler
Marie-Madeleine Gauthier, A French Art Historian.
Mary Gauthier (born 1962), American singer
Michel Gauthier, Canadian politician
Mylène Gauthier, the French-Canadian singer Mylène Farmer
Paul Gauthier (theologian), French theologian
Paule Gauthier, Canadian lawyer
Pierre Gauthier, Canadian ice hockey executive
Pierre Gauthier (politician), Canadian politician
Sean Gauthier, Canadian ice hockey player
Terry Gauthier, American politician
Théophile Gauthier, French writer, usually Théophil Gautier
Tyler Gauthier (born 1997), American football player
Ursula Gauthier, French journalist
Victor-Auguste Gauthier (1837–1911), French amateur palaeontologist.
Pierre Gauthier (1930-2016), dit Gartier, French painter

Places
Gauthier, Ontario, Canada
Ferme Gauthier, Algeria

See also
Gaultier (disambiguation)
Gautier (disambiguation)

References

French-language surnames
Surnames from given names